Erik "Myggan" Uddebom (born 5 July 1934) is a retired Swedish athlete. He competed in the shot put and discus throw at the 1956 and 1960 Olympics with the best result of sixth place in the shot put in 1956. He set 11 national shot put record and was the first Swede to break the 17 meter barrier in this event.

Uddebom won the national titles in the shot put (1955–57, 1959–61, 1963–64), discus throw (1956, 1961) and weightlifting (1964), and also competed in the javelin throw and high jump. For many years he was director of the Stora Grabbars Association.

References

1934 births
Living people
Swedish male shot putters
Swedish male discus throwers
Olympic athletes of Sweden
Athletes (track and field) at the 1956 Summer Olympics
Athletes (track and field) at the 1960 Summer Olympics
Athletes from Stockholm